A Bing Bang Holidang is a charity holiday music album by Bleu.  Released in 1999, it was released as a benefit for Boston Institute for Arts Therapy and featured contributions from Boston musicians and bands such as Guster, The Mighty Mighty Bosstones, Kay Hanley, and Bill Janovitz.

Track listing
Sources: Official Site, Allmusic

References

1999 albums
Bleu (musician) albums